Alexandru Corban (born 29 January 1998) is a Romanian professional footballer who plays as a midfielder for CSM Bacău.

Honours
Aerostar Bacău
Liga III: 2019–20

References

External links
 
 

1998 births
Living people
People from Comănești
Romanian footballers
Association football midfielders
Liga I players
FC Botoșani players
Liga II players
CS Știința Miroslava players
CS Aerostar Bacău players
Liga III players